Dapayk is an alias for German musician, label owner and techno producer Niklas Worgt (born February 8, 1978 in Bad Frankenhausen, Germany). He is one of the protagonists of Germany's MinimalTechno scene.

Biography 
Born in Thuringia Dapayk initially came into contact with BrokenBeats and Drum and Bass in the early 90s. His first stage appearances happened as the DrumandBass Live Act 'Frauds in White' and marked the beginning of his career in the electronic music business. With 'Frauds in White' and his former alter ego 'Sonstware' Dapayk became a well-known Resident DJ in Central Germany.

By the end of the 90s he reformed his sounds. His productions transcended from broken beats to straight Techno. A form of Techno that is known today as an experimental platform under the alias Dapayk.

In 2000, after his first releases Dapayk founded his label 'Mo's Ferry Productions'. The label is mainly dedicated to minimalistic Techno and was extended by the sublabels 'Fenou' in 2005 and 'Rrygular' in 2006. His significant role in MinimalTechno today is due to his appearances as a live act, remixer and various collaborations. With his wife, photo model Eva Padberg, he formed the project 'Dapayk & Padberg' and released their fifth album 'Harbour' in the spring of 2017, after the success of 'Close Up', 'Black Beauty', 'Sweet Nothings' and 'Smoke'.

Apart from his own labels Dapayk releases on labels such as ‘Stil vor Talent’, ‘Herzblut’, ‘Karloff’, ‘Textone’, ‘Orac’, ‘Contexterrrior’, ‘Resopal Schallware’ and ‘Friends of Tomorrow’. Furthermore, he produced various solo albums incognito as ‘Marek Bois’ on ‘Trapez’ or ‘Rrygular’.

Dapayk continues to work as studio producer for artists like Monika Kruse, 'Marcel Knopf' and 'Kleinschmager Audio'.

Private life 
After being in a relationship for ten years, Niklas Worgt married photo model Eva Padberg on July 29, 2006. They live together in Berlin.

Albums

Sound 
Dapayk describes his own tone as 'frickle'. Sound wise he experiments merging separate musical art forms from Minimal, Electronica and Breakbeats into one.

Discography (Excerpt)

Remixes (Excerpt)

Awards 
In 2005 Dapayk and Padberg's first album 'Close Up' was under the Top 10 of the de:Bug and Groove Magazine’s charts. In 2007 the project ‘Dapayk and Padberg’ received the Style Award of Musikexpress in the category ‘Performer – Domestic’.

External links 

 MySpace
 Interview with Dapayk and Padberg on Stern.de

References 

German electronic musicians
Living people
1978 births
Musicians from Thuringia
People from Schwarzburg-Rudolstadt